Wetdog is a London-based all-female post-punk trio, formed in the spring of 2007. The band released their first album, "Enterprise Reversal", in 2008 on Angular Records. It was followed by their second album, "Frauhaus", which was released on both Angular and on the Captured Tracks label. The first single from "Frauhaus" was "Lower Leg". The band released its third album, "Divine Times", on 4 May 2015 on Upset the Rhythm.

Discography 
 Enterprise Reversal (2008)
 Frauhaus (2009)
 Divine Times (2015)

Reception
Many critics have compared Wetdog's sound to that of the Fall. According to Metacritic, "Frauhaus" received generally favorable reviews from critics, with a score of 64/100.

References

All-female punk bands
Underground punk scene in the United Kingdom
Post-punk revival music groups
American musical trios
Musical groups established in 2007
2007 establishments in the United Kingdom
Musical groups from London
Riot grrrl bands
Captured Tracks artists